United Nations Security Council resolution 1614, adopted unanimously on 29 July 2005, after recalling previous resolutions on Israel and Lebanon, including resolutions 425 (1978), 426 (1978) and 1583 (2005), the Council extended the mandate of the United Nations Interim Force in Lebanon (UNIFIL) for a further six months until 31 January 2006.

Resolution

Observations
The Security Council recalled the Secretary-General Kofi Annan's conclusion that Israel had withdrawn its forces from Lebanon as of 16 June 2000, in accordance with Resolution 425. It emphasised the temporary nature of the UNIFIL operation and urged respect for the Blue Line, given recent incidents. There was concern at tensions along the Blue Line, and the Council felt, along with the Secretary-General, that the situation did not warrant a change in UNIFIL's mandate.

Acts
The Lebanese government was called upon to restore its authority in southern Lebanon through the deployment of Lebanese forces. The parties were urged to ensure UNIFIL's full freedom of movement and to ensure its safety. Both Israel and Lebanon were called upon to fulfill commitments to respect the withdrawal line identified by the United Nations and all air, sea and land violations of the line were condemned.

The resolution supported efforts by UNIFIL to monitor violations of the withdrawal line and efforts in demining, encouraging the need for additional maps to be provided of the location of land mines. The Secretary-General was requested to continue consultations with the Lebanese government and troop-contributing countries concerning the implementation of the current resolution. It further directed him to report on the activities of UNIFIL and on tasks conducted by the United Nations Truce Supervision Organization (UNTSO).

Finally, the resolution concluded by stressing the importance of a just and lasting peace in the Middle East based on relevant Security Council resolutions including 242 (1967) and 338 (1973).

See also 
 Israeli–Lebanese conflict
 List of United Nations Security Council Resolutions 1601 to 1700 (2005–2006)
 2000–2006 Shebaa Farms conflict

References

External links
 
Text of the Resolution at undocs.org

 1614
 1614
 1614
Hezbollah–Israel conflict
2005 in Israel
2005 in Lebanon
July 2005 events